John Kael Weston (born 1972) is an American diplomat, author, and politician. He was a candidate for the U.S. House of Representatives in Utah's 2nd congressional district in the 2020 election. A member of the Democratic Party, Weston ran against incumbent Chris Stewart. He was also a candidate for the Democratic primary for the 2022 United States Senate election in Utah.

Weston spent over a decade serving in the United States Department of State, including seven years as an advisor for the wars in Iraq and Afghanistan, from 2003 to 2010., and earned the State Department's Award for Heroism. He previously led the United States' effort in the United Nations Security Council to freeze assets linked to al-Qaeda. He is an instructor at Westminster College and the Marine Corps University. He also serves on Salt Lake County's Open Space Advisory Board.

Family, early life, and education
Weston's grandfather served in World War II and his father served in the Vietnam War. His mother was a teacher for 25 years at Westmore Elementary School in Orem, Utah. His parents grew up in Milford, Utah, and had descended from Danish immigrants. Weston has an identical twin brother, Kyle.

Weston grew up in Northern Utah, and graduated from the University of Utah in 1996, with a major in political science and a minor in history. He later received a master's from the University of Cambridge, and spent a year as a Fulbright Scholar in Amsterdam.

Career

State Department service

Weston's seven years in Iraq and Afghanistan was more than any other State Department officer. During his time, he was a political adviser to combat units on the battlefield. He spent two and a half years on the ground before, during and after the Battle of Fallujah. His supervisor, political counselor Robert Ford, said Weston "had the toughest, most dangerous assignment of any State Department officer worldwide.” Weston has reported he was "almost killed numerous times in both wars, including surviving a suicide car bomb attack in Khost, Afghanistan, Taliban machine gun rounds hitting a mud wall a few feet away, insurgent RPGs overhead, not to mention more than a few additional loud bullets whizzing nearby. Despite these close calls, I did not carry a weapon... just a lot of notebooks." Weston earned the Award for Heroism from the State Department for his time in Fallujah.

Weston has written a memoir, The Mirror Test: America at War in Iraq and Afghanistan, detailing his time in the State Department serving in Iraq and Afghanistan. It was chosen as a New York Times Editors’ Choice book, and a Military Times Best Book of the Year.

2020 congressional election

Weston announced his campaign with an editorial in the Salt Lake Tribune on December 15, 2019. Prior to Weston's entering the race, UtahPolicy.com had reported the Democratic Congressional Campaign Committee considered Chris Stewart potentially vulnerable to a strong opponent, due to Donald Trump's unpopularity in the 2nd district, and Stewart's record of vigorously defending him. A poll taken in January 2020 among likely voters showed Stewart with 38% of the vote, and a Democratic challenger with 36% of the vote. (The remainder were undecided or voting for someone else.)

On April 25, 2020, Weston defeated two challengers at the Utah state Democratic convention (which was held virtually due to coronavirus) to clinch the nomination. By receiving 83% of the vote of the party delegates, Weston avoided a primary campaign.

Weston was endorsed by Ted Wilson, the former mayor of Salt Lake City, and Shireen Ghorbani, a Salt Lake County council member and former candidate for Utah's 2nd congressional district.

Political positions

Weston supports the Affordable Care Act (Obamacare), calling it "a public policy focused on the public good." Weston also supports efforts to preserve, improve, and extend the law to reduce the number of uninsured Americans.

Weston has publicly expressed concern about "serious and lasting damage" to the American "brand" by Trump's allegedly anti-immigration rhetoric, and by actions taken by his administration that "appear intended to punish entire classes of people from Latin America," such as family separations at the southern US border with Mexico.

Weston considers the Afghanistan War to have been "a necessary war", but says the Iraq War was not. Weston broke with President Obama over the decision to approve a 30,000-troop surge in Afghanistan in late 2009. Weston instead believed the president should have determined how many troops to commit to Afghanistan for a decade, and then have pledged that level of support over that timeframe.

In May 2019, Weston co-authored an editorial opposing President Trump’s proposed pardoning of accused or convicted war criminals. Later that year, Trump pardoned Eddie Gallagher and granted clemency to two other soldiers accused or convicted of war crimes.

In January 2020, after the killing of Iranian general Qasem Soleimani by air strike, Weston published an editorial in the Salt Lake Tribune stating his opposition to the attack. Weston argued the strike made the United States less safe by provoking Iran.

Weston has criticized the Trump administration's response to the COVID-19 pandemic and its decision to withdraw from the World Health Organization.

Weston's campaign website lists his priorities as health care, living wages, gun violence, public lands, climate policy, money in politics, veterans' issues, and human rights.

Notes

References

External links

 Campaign website
 The Mirror Test

1972 births
21st-century American politicians
Alumni of the University of Cambridge
American people of Danish descent
Living people
American twins
United States Foreign Service personnel
United States government people of the Iraq War
University of Utah alumni
Utah Democrats